Verdaille is a painting executed entirely or primarily in shades of green. Such a painting is described as having been painted "en verdaille".   

Verdaille has its roots in 12th century stained glass made for Cistercian monasteries, which prohibited the use of colored art in 1134. Such paintings are less common than paintings executed in grey (grisaille) or in brown (brunaille).

References

External links 

Artistic techniques
Painting techniques
Decorative arts